St Pancras, St. Pancras or Saint Pancras may refer to:

Saints
 Pancras of Taormina, bishop martyred in AD 40 in Sicily
 Pancras of Rome, martyred c. AD 304, after whom the following are directly or indirectly named

Geography
United Kingdom
 St Pancras, London, a district of London
 St Pancras Old Church, a medieval church after which the district was named
 St Pancras New Church, a 19th-century church built when the above fell into disrepair
 St Pancras and Islington Cemetery, in East Finchley, opened when the churchyard became full
 St Pancras Hospital, occupying the former workhouse and surrounding the old churchyard
 St Pancras railway station, a national and international railway station
 King's Cross St Pancras tube station, a London Underground station attached to the railway station
 Metropolitan Borough of St Pancras, a local government area (1899-1965)
 St Pancras, Soper Lane, a church in the City of London
 St Pancras, a church in the village of West Bagborough, Somerset 
 Church of St. Agnes and St. Pancras, Toxteth Park, a church in Liverpool, Merseyside
 St Pancras Church, Ipswich, a church in Ipswich, Suffolk
 Priory of St Pancras, Cluniac priory in Lewes, Sussex
 St Pancras Church (Kingston near Lewes), 13th-century church in East Sussex
 St Pancras Church, Exeter
 Church of Saint Pancras, Widecombe-in-the-Moor, Devon
  Saint Pancras Church, Pancrasweek, near Holsworthy Devon

Rest of the world
 Sint Pancras, a village in North Holland, Netherlands
 St. Pankraz, South Tyrol, Italy
 Sankt Pankraz, Austria
 Pankrác, a neighborhood of Prague and its metro station, named for the Svatý Pankrác church
 Parish Church of the Immaculate Heart of Mary and St. Pancras, Montevideo, Uruguay
 St Pancras RC Church and School, Glendale Queens New York

See also
 Church of Saint Pancras (disambiguation)
San Pancrazio (disambiguation)
Saint-Pancrace (disambiguation)